is a former Japanese football player.

Playing career
Machida was born in Honjo on May 23, 1981. After graduating from high school, he joined J1 League club Kashiwa Reysol in 2000. On September 22, 2001, he debuted as forward against Vissel Kobe and played many matches in late 2001. However he could not play many matches in 2002. In 2003, he moved to Kyoto Purple Sanga. Although he played many matches until summer, he could hardly play in the match in late 2003. In 2004, he moved to J2 League club Kawasaki Frontale. Although he played many matches as substitute forward until summer, he could hardly play in the match in late 2004. In 2005, he moved to Tokyo Verdy. He played many matches as substitute from summer. He retired end of 2005 season.

Club statistics

References

External links

orions.ne.jp

1981 births
Living people
Association football people from Saitama Prefecture
Japanese footballers
J1 League players
J2 League players
Kashiwa Reysol players
Kyoto Sanga FC players
Kawasaki Frontale players
Tokyo Verdy players
Association football forwards